Hebei Subdistrict is a subdistrict in Gongzhuling, Jilin province, China. , it has four residential communities under its administration:
Jinghua Community
Chaoyang Community
Xinfa Community
Nongchang Community

See also 
 List of township-level divisions of Jilin

References 

Township-level divisions of Jilin
Gongzhuling